Samuel Brittleton (17 June 1885 – 4 October 1951) was an English footballer who played at inside-left for various clubs in the 1900s. He was the brother of England international Tom Brittleton.

Football career
Brittleton was born in Winsford, Cheshire and started his professional career at Stockport County in August 1905, a few months after his brother had left County to join Sheffield Wednesday. After three years with Stockport County, without breaking into the first team, he moved to Preston in February 1908 followed by a further move in the summer of 1908 to join Chorley of the Lancashire Combination.

At Chorley, Brittleton began to establish a reputation as a useful inside-forward and attracted the attention of several Football League clubs. In the summer of 1909, he had agreed to join Manchester City, who had just been relegated from the Football League First Division with the two clubs arguing over the size of the transfer fee. Before a deal could be completed, he was signed by Southampton of the Southern League.

He made his debut for the "Saints" in a 1–1 draw at Queens Park Rangers on 25 September 1909, when he replaced Frank Jordan at inside-left. Described as "sometimes brilliant, sometimes hopeless", Brittleton lost his place in the side after a run of nine matches, with Bob Carter replacing him. In March, after an injury to John Bainbridge, Carter moved to outside-right with Brittleton being recalled at inside-left. He marked his recall by scoring in a 1–1 draw at West Ham followed by another goal a week later against Portsmouth.

In the summer of 1909, Brittleton decide to return to North West England although Southampton retained his registration. He was released a year later and rejoined his former club, Chorley before spending a year at Accrington Stanley.

References

1885 births
1951 deaths
People from Winsford
English footballers
Association football forwards
Stockport County F.C. players
Preston North End F.C. players
Chorley F.C. players
Southampton F.C. players
Accrington Stanley F.C. (1891) players
Southern Football League players
English Football League players
Sportspeople from Cheshire